Johannes van der Aeck (1636–1682) was a Dutch Golden Age painter.

Biography
According to the RKD he is known for genre works. He was born and died in Leiden. According to the NNBW he was the son of the wine merchant Niclaes van der Aeck and became a member of the Leiden Guild of St. Luke in 1658. He was deacon of the guild in the years in 1673, 1674, and 1676.

References

Bibliography
 
Johannes van der Aeck on Artnet

1636 births
1682 deaths
Dutch Golden Age painters
Dutch male painters
Artists from Leiden
Painters from Leiden